Cyclops is an action-adventure novel by Clive Cussler.  This is the 8th book featuring the author’s primary protagonist, Dirk Pitt.

Plot summary 
A wealthy American financier disappears on a treasure hunt in an antique blimp. From Cuban waters, the blimp drifts toward Florida with a crew of dead men—Soviet cosmonauts. Dirk Pitt discovers a shocking scheme: a covert group of U.S. industrialists has put a colony on the moon, a secret base they will defend at any cost. Threatened in space, the Russians are about to strike a savage blow in Cuba—and only Dirk Pitt can stop them. From a Cuban torture chamber to the cold ocean depths, Pitt is racing to defuse an international conspiracy that threatens to shatter the Earth.

Characters
Dirk Pitt – Special Projects Director for the National Underwater and Marine Agency (NUMA).
Admiral James Sandecker – Chief Director of NUMA.
Al Giordino – Assistant Special Projects Director for NUMA.
Rudi Gunn – Director of Logistics for NUMA.
Foss Gly – Arizona-born criminal who Pitt had encountered before in Night Probe!, and whom Charles Sarveux wrongly presumed as dead from a rigged aircraft.
Vincent Margolin – The President of the United States. Previously the Vice President before the President was impeached.
President Georgi Antonov – Soviet President.
Martine Brogan – Director of the Central Intelligence Agency.
Ira Hagen – Brother-in-law of Vincent Margolin, who is hired to identify the members for the Inner Core.

Release details
1986, United States, Simon & Schuster , 1986, Hardcover.
1986, United States, Pocket Books, December 1986, Paperback.
1987, United States, Random House Value Publishing, June 23, 1987, Hardcover.
1989, United States, Pocket Books Reissue, November 15, 1989, Paperback.

1986 American novels
American thriller novels
Dirk Pitt novels
Books with cover art by Paul Bacon